The 1942 Alameda Coast Guard Sea Lions football team was an American football team that represented the United States Coast Guard's Alameda Coast Guard training station during the 1942 college football season. The team compiled a 1–7–1 record. Lieutenant Joe Verducci was the coach. The team was christened as the "Sea Lions" in September 1942.

Schedule

References

Alameda Coast Guard
Alameda Coast Guard Sea Lions football seasons
Alameda Coast Guard Sea Lions football